Ahmed Mousa ((born 23 October 1976) is a Kuwaiti retired footballer who was an attacking midfielder for the Kuwaiti Premier League club Al Arabi.

References

1976 births
Living people
Kuwaiti footballers
Association football midfielders
Kuwait international footballers
Al-Arabi SC (Kuwait) players
Al-Nasr SC (Kuwait) players
Kuwait Premier League players